There are two municipalities named Saint-Isidore in Quebec:

Saint-Isidore, Montérégie, Quebec, in Roussillon Regional County Municipality
Saint-Isidore, Chaudière-Appalaches, Quebec, in La Nouvelle-Beauce Regional County Municipality